The reprivatisation fraud in Warsaw happened on a massive scale during the , which was performed after the fall of the Communist Poland to reverse the post-World War II nationalisation of the land in the city.

A particularly notable affair regarding a lot on Chmielna Street in the downtown of Warsaw was uncovered after a series of investigative reports published by Gazeta Wyborcza in 2016. (This had earned the journalists the Grand Press 2016 award, the highest award for journalism in Poland and several other awards. )

In 2017 the Polish government established a dedicated ; as of July 2018 the Commission has reversed over a dozen of the decisions, but some of its rulings have led to further controversies and several trials.

See also
 Miasto Jest Nasze
 Property restitution in Poland

References

Corruption in Poland
21st century in Warsaw
Events in Warsaw
2010s in Warsaw